Heth Ridge is a ridge  long, located  south of the Hornblende Bluffs and near the head of Suvorov Glacier, in the Wilson Hills of Antarctica. It was mapped by the United States Geological Survey from surveys and U.S. Navy air photos, 1960–63, and was named by the Advisory Committee on Antarctic Names for Samuel R. Heth, a United States Antarctic Research Program biologist at Hallett Station, 1968–69.

References

Ridges of Oates Land